Anthology 1 is a compilation album by the Beatles, released on 20 November 1995 by Apple Records as part of The Beatles Anthology series. It features rarities, outtakes and live performances from the period 1958–64, including songs with original bass player Stuart Sutcliffe and drummer Pete Best. It is the first in a trilogy of albums with Anthology 2 and Anthology 3, all of which tie in with the televised special The Beatles Anthology. It contains "Free as a Bird", the first new Beatles song in 25 years, which was released as a single two weeks after Anthology 1.

The album topped the Billboard 200 album chart and was certified 8× Platinum by the RIAA. It reached number 2 on the UK albums chart.

The Anthology albums were remastered and made available digitally on the iTunes Store on 14 June 2011, individually and as part of the Anthology Box Set.

Content
The album includes material from the Beatles' days as the Quarrymen, through the Decca audition to sessions for the album Beatles for Sale. It is of historical interest as the only official release of performances with Best and Sutcliffe in the band - Sutcliffe, the band's original bass player during 1960, and sporadically during the group's second Hamburg season, appears on the disc-one tracks "Hallelujah, I Love Her So", "You'll Be Mine" and "Cayenne"; while Best, who was the official drummer from just prior to the group's first departure for Hamburg in August 1960 until 15 August 1962 when he was replaced by Ringo Starr, is on Disc One, tracks 10–12, 15–19 and 21–22.

Disc One, tracks 10–12, were recorded at a session in Hamburg where the Beatles served as the back-up band to the English rock and roll musician Tony Sheridan. Some songs from this session were released on the 1962 album My Bonnie, credited to Tony Sheridan and the Beat Brothers. The song "My Bonnie" would be their introductory single in England, featuring Sheridan on lead vocal and guitar. Tracks 21–22 are the only surviving recordings of the Beatles' first EMI session. Track 22 is the original recording of "Love Me Do", which would be re-recorded by the group four months later for their first single. Track 24 features EMI session drummer Andy White, in place of Ringo.

Disc Two contains performances from comedy duo Morecambe and Wise's popular television programme, Two of a Kind, as well as the opening song from their famed performance on The Ed Sullivan Show, which introduced the band to most of the US in 1964.

The flash-point for the album came with the song "Free as a Bird" – the three remaining Beatles Paul McCartney, George Harrison and Ringo Starr re-working a John Lennon demo recording given to McCartney by Lennon's widow, Yoko Ono. Produced by Harrison's Traveling Wilburys bandmate Jeff Lynne, the three added additional music and lyrics, instrumentation and backing vocals, with McCartney and Harrison both taking a turn at a lead vocal.

The live BBC Radio recording of "Lend Me Your Comb" was held back from Live at the BBC for inclusion on this album, but it was later also included on On Air – Live at the BBC Volume 2.

Album cover
The cover of Anthology 1 is the first third of the Anthology collage made by Klaus Voormann and Alfons Kiefer. Various photographs and album covers are torn and collected together. Pete Best's face was torn away from the Savage Young Beatles record jacket in the centre of the album cover, revealing the face of his successor, Ringo Starr, below. The bottom leftmost photograph on the Anthology 1 cover does feature an unobscured Best.

The missing portion of the photo was subsequently used on the cover of Best's 2008 album Haymans Green, an act described by one fan as "Pete Best's revenge".

Reception

The album was a large success throughout the world. It was the first Beatles album to enter the Billboard 200 album chart at number one. It sold 855,473 copies in its first week, the 27th largest one-week sales in the Soundscan history, succeeding Fresh Horses by Garth Brooks. In its second week, Anthology 1 sold 453,000 copies and maintained the top spot. This was repeated the following week, with 435,000 copies sold. In its fourth week, the same quantity was sold, but the album fell to number two, behind Mariah Carey's Daydream. In the following week, the album fell to number three but with 601,000 sales. Anthology 1 was certified 3× Platinum by the RIAA after six weeks in the US market. In all, the album spent 29 weeks on the Billboard 200, reaching cumulative sales of 3,639,000 sales as of April 2001. In the UK, reaction was similar, but the album peaked at number two, behind Robson & Jerome's eponymous album. In Australia, the album spent two weeks at number one in December 1995.

Track listing
Spoken word tracks in italic.

CD release
All tracks in stereo, except spoken word tracks and where noted.

Vinyl release

Side one
"Free as a Bird"
"We were four guys ... that's all"
"That'll Be the Day"
"In Spite of All the Danger"
"Sometimes I'd borrow ... those still exist"
"Hallelujah, I Love Her So"
"You'll Be Mine"
"Cayenne"
"First of all ... it didn't do a thing here"
"My Bonnie"
"Ain't She Sweet"
"Cry for a Shadow"

Side two
"Brian was a beautiful guy ... he presented us well"
"I secured them ... a Beatle drink even then"
"Searchin
"Three Cool Cats"
"The Sheik of Araby"
"Like Dreamers Do"
"Hello Little Girl"
"Well, the recording test ... by my artists"
"Besame Mucho"
"Love Me Do"
"How Do You Do It"
"Please Please Me"

Side three
"One After 909" (sequence)
"One After 909" (complete)
"Lend Me Your Comb"
"I'll Get You"
"We were performers ... in Britain"
"I Saw Her Standing There"
"From Me to You"
"Money (That's What I Want)"
"You Really Got a Hold on Me"
"Roll Over Beethoven"

Side four
"She Loves You"
"Till There Was You"
"Twist and Shout"
"This Boy"
"I Want to Hold Your Hand"
"Boys, what I was thinking..."
"Moonlight Bay"
"Can't Buy Me Love"

Side five
"All My Loving"
"You Can't Do That"
"And I Love Her"
"A Hard Day's Night"
"I Wanna Be Your Man"
"Long Tall Sally"
"Boys"
"Shout"
"I'll Be Back" (Take 2)
"I'll Be Back" (Take 3)

Side six
"You Know What to Do"
"No Reply" (demo)
"Mr. Moonlight"
"Leave My Kitten Alone"
"No Reply"
"Eight Days a Week" (sequence)
"Eight Days a Week" (complete)
"Kansas City / Hey-Hey-Hey-Hey!"

Cassette release

Side one
"Free as a Bird"
"We were four guys ... that's all"
"That'll Be the Day"
"In Spite of All the Danger"
"Sometimes I'd borrow ... those still exist"
"Hallelujah, I Love Her So"
"You'll Be Mine"
"Cayenne"
"First of all ... it didn't do a thing here"
"My Bonnie"
"Ain't She Sweet"
"Cry for a Shadow"
"Brian was a beautiful guy ... he presented us well"
"I secured them ... a Beatle drink even then"
"Searchin
"Three Cool Cats"
"The Sheik of Araby"
"Like Dreamers Do"
"Hello Little Girl"

Side two
"Well, the recording test ... by my artists"
"Besame Mucho"
"Love Me Do"
"How Do You Do It"
"Please Please Me"
"One After 909" (sequence)
"One After 909" (complete)
"Lend Me Your Comb"
"I'll Get You"
"We were performers ... in Britain"
"I Saw Her Standing There"
"From Me to You"
"Money (That's What I Want)"
"You Really Got a Hold on Me"
"Roll Over Beethoven"

Side three
"She Loves You"
"Till There Was You"
"Twist and Shout"
"This Boy"
"I Want to Hold Your Hand"
"Boys, what I was thinking..."
"Moonlight Bay"
"Can't Buy Me Love"
"All My Loving"
"You Can't Do That"
"And I Love Her"
"A Hard Day's Night"

Side four
"I Wanna Be Your Man"
"Long Tall Sally"
"Boys"
"Shout"
"I'll Be Back" (Take 2)
"I'll Be Back" (Take 3)
"You Know What to Do"
"No Reply" (demo)
"Mr. Moonlight"
"Leave My Kitten Alone"
"No Reply"
"Eight Days a Week" (sequence)
"Eight Days a Week" (complete)
"Kansas City / Hey-Hey-Hey-Hey!"

Charts

Weekly charts

Year-end charts

Certifications and sales

Personnel
The Beatles
 George Harrison – vocals, lead guitar
 John Lennon – vocals, rhythm guitar, harmonica
 Paul McCartney – vocals, bass guitar, rhythm guitar
 Ringo Starr – vocals, drums, percussion
 Pete Best – drums on "My Bonnie", "Ain't She Sweet", "Cry for a Shadow", "Searchin'", "Three Cool Cats", "The Sheik of Araby", "Like Dreamers Do", "Hello Little Girl", "Bésame Mucho", "Love Me Do"
 Stuart Sutcliffe – bass guitar on "Hallelujah, I Love Her So", "You'll Be Mine", "Cayenne"

Additional musicians
 Colin Hanton – drums on  "That'll Be the Day", "In Spite of All the Danger"
 John Lowe – piano on "That'll Be the Day", "In Spite of All the Danger"
 Tony Sheridan – lead vocal and lead guitar (guitar solo) on "My Bonnie"
 Andy White – drums on "Please Please Me"

References

1995 compilation albums
Albums produced by George Martin
Albums produced by Jeff Lynne
Albums recorded at IBC Studios
Albums with cover art by Klaus Voormann
Apple Records compilation albums
Compilation albums published posthumously
The Beatles Anthology
The Beatles compilation albums
Albums recorded in a home studio
Albums produced by John Lennon
Albums produced by Paul McCartney
Albums produced by George Harrison
Albums produced by Ringo Starr